Dos mujeres, un camino (English title: Two women, one path) is a Mexican neo-noir telenovela produced by Emilio Larrosa for Televisa in 1993-1994. This production was exhibited in 47 countries, including Indonesia, had high viewer ratings, and has been described as one of Televisa's most successful telenovelas.

Erik Estrada, Laura León and Bibi Gaytán starred as protagonists, while Enrique Rocha, Claudio Báez, Luz María Jerez, Elizabeth Dupeyrón, Lorena Herrera, Eduardo Liceaga and Rodrigo Vidal starred as antagonists. Tejano singer Selena appeared in two episodes.

Plot
The series tells the story of Johnny, a Mexican truck driver and family man who falls in love with a woman he meets in his travels, and of the complications as a consequence of his new love. Dos Mujeres... used the then-new North American Free Trade Agreement (NAFTA) as a backdrop to the story; Johnny transported merchandise from Mexico to the United States.

Johnny had enemies in Tijuana, where he was blamed for the death of Bernardo Montegarza (Eduardo Liceaga), son of the Montegarza family. Johnny is still very much in love with his wife (Laura León) when he falls for a young waitress, Tanya (Bibi Gaytán), whose mother owns a restaurant that Johnny frequents.

Tanya does not know he is married, and Raymundo, a police officer in love with Tanya, is working with fellow officer Ángel to pursue the head of the family that blames Johnny for the young man's death. It is later discovered that Johnny did not cause Bernardo's death, and while he was struggling to decide whether he wants to stay with his wife or his girlfriend, Tanya dies taking a knife thrust intended for her rival – Johnny's wife – Ana Maria.

Johnny and Ana Maria reconcile after Tanya's death. The final scene shows the couple retiring for the evening. Johnny, dreaming of Tanya's death, calls her name in his sleep. When he awakes in the morning, Ana Maria and the children are gone, but in a letter, she promises that he will see the children, but not her.

Cast

Main
Erik Estrada as Juan Daniel "Johnny" Villegas
Laura León as Ana María Romero de Villegas
Bibi Gaytán as Tania García Pérez / Tania Montegarza Pérez
Enrique Rocha† as Don Ismael Montegarza
Luz María Jerez as Alejandra Montegarza Almonte
Elizabeth Dupeyrón as Amalia Núñez de Toruño
Claudio Báez† as Enrique Iliades
José Flores as Emiliano
Rodrigo Vidal as Ricardo "Richi" Montegarza Almonte
Itatí Cantoral as Graciela Toruño Nuñez / Graciela Torres Nuñez
Roberto Palazuelos as Raymundo Soto #1
Sergio Sendel as Raymundo Soto #2
Juan Carlos Casasola as Leobardo
María Clara Zurita as Elena Pérez de García
Mario Sauret as Agustín García Ordoñez
Jorge Salinas as Ángel Lascuraín
Francisco Huerdo as Guillermo "Memo" Villegas Romero
Carlos Miguel as Cristóbal Platas
Gabriela Platas as Paola Iliades
Members of Grupo Bronco as Themselves
Lorena Herrera as Lorena Arau Bermúdez

Recurring
 
Hugo Macías Macotela as El Comanche
Roberto Tello as Odilón
Salvador Garcini as Roberto Toruño / Roberto Torres
Eduardo Liceaga as Bernardo Montegarza Almonte "Medusa"
Marina Marín as Lucrecia Almonte de Montegarza
Anadela as Anadela
Monica Dossetti as Alicia
Horacio Almada as Homero
Queta Carrasco† as "Grandmother Drugdealer"
Magdalena Cabrera as Silvia
José Antonio Iturriaga as Armando
Oyuki Manjarrez as Lupita
Jorge Becerril as "El Diablo"
Rodolfo de Alejandre as Lucas
Silvia Valdez as Dominga
Alfredo Alonso as Gerente
Rodrigo Ruiz as Freddy
Magdalena Cabrera as Shirley
Sussan Taunton as Susana
Yaxkin Santalucía as Arturo
Amparo Garrido as Bertha
Rodolfo Velez as Germán*
Selena as herself
Gustavo Aguilar "Manotas"
Alfonso Kafiti as Commander Sergio Buenrostro
Jaime Puga as Commander Camilo Martínez
Carlos Bonavides as herself
Carlos González as "El Toro"
Miguel "El Piojo" Herrera as herself
Juan Raúl Hernández
Isadora González
Guillermo Iván
Rodrigo Zurita
Rodrigo de la Colina
Carlos Osiris
Raúl Ruíz 
Ángeles Yáñez
Félix Córdova

Awards

References

External links

1993 telenovelas
Mexican telenovelas
1993 Mexican television series debuts
1994 Mexican television series endings
Spanish-language telenovelas
Television shows set in Mexico
Televisa telenovelas